Brooks Mansion is a Greek Revival plantation house and Category II Landmark. It is located at 901 Newton Street, Northeast, Washington, D.C., in the Brookland neighborhood, next to the Brookland–CUA (WMATA station).

History
Col. Jehiel Brooks married Ann Margaret Queen. After returning from the Red River Indian Agency, they lived on their 246-acre Bellair plantation.

In 1887, the house and land were sold to an Ida U. Marshall, who sold to Benjamin F. Leighton and Richard E. Pairo. They subdivided Bellair, and developed the suburb of Brookland. The mansion house and 2 acres were sold to Elizabeth Varney, who operated a boarding house. In 1891, the Marist Brothers bought the Brooks mansion. They added a wing to the house and sold to the Benedictine Sisters.

In 1905, the Benedictine Sisters of Elizabeth, New Jersey moved to the Brooks Mansion. In 1906, they founded St. Anthony's Academy for young children, and operated a shelter for women.

In 1911, the Catholic University of America began educating the sisters at the mansion.

In 1928, women were admitted to Catholic University of America, and the mansion became St. Anthony's High School.

In 1970, Washington Metropolitan Area Transit Authority bought the mansion.

It was listed in the National Register of Historic Places on July 17, 1975.

It was named as an endangered place by the D.C. Preservation League in 1999.

It was bought by the DC government in 1979, and is used by the Public Access Corporation for the District of Columbia (DCTV).

See also
 National Register of Historic Places listings in Washington, D.C.

References

External links
 http://brooklandavenue.com/blog/?p=687

Brookland (Washington, D.C.)
Houses on the National Register of Historic Places in Washington, D.C.
Houses completed in 1840
Houses in Washington, D.C.
Greek Revival houses in Washington, D.C.
Plantation houses in Washington, D.C.